Chawandiya is a village in Ajmer tehsil of Ajmer district of Rajasthan state in India. The village falls under Ganahera gram panchayat.

Demography 
As per 2011 census of India, Chawandiya has population of 2,188 of which 1,130 are males and 1,058 are females. Sex ratio of the village is 936.

Transportation
Chawandiya is connected by air (Kishangarh Airport), by train (Ajmer Junction railway station) and by road.

See also
Ajmer Tehsil

References

Villages in Ajmer district